East Meets West is a Japanese Western film directed by Okamoto Kihachi, and was released in 1995.

Plot
The film starts off with an old man in the desert, and two signs are shown; one marked East, the other West.

Japan has sent a mission to San Francisco. In San Francisco, the Japanese are surprised by American culture.

One American, Gus Taylor, and his gang steal all the gold from the mission and make their way into the desert.  One of the samurai on the mission chases after the gang into the desert. He is joined by a young American boy, Sam, whose father was killed by the gang leader. The group picks up a variety of people along the way to New Mexico.

The Japanese and the Americans on the trip share parts of their cultures with each other. The group of vigilantes eventually makes it to New Mexico and finds the gang. They take back their stolen gold and return to San Francisco.

Cast
 Christopher Mayer as Gus Taylor
 Hiroyuki Sanada as Kamijo Kenkichi
 Scott Bachicha as Sam
 Tatsuya Nakadai as Rentaro Katsu
 Naoto Takenaka as Tommy, Tamejiro
 Ittoku Kishibe as John Manjiro
 Richard Nason as Hutch
 Angelique Midthunder as Nantai (as Angelique Roehm)
 Etsushi Takahashi as Kimura
 Jay Kerr as Hardy
 David Midthunder as Red Hair

Production
 Yoshinobu Nishioka - Art director

References

External links
 

1995 films
Films directed by Kihachi Okamoto
1990s Japanese-language films
1995 Western (genre) films
Samurai films
Jidaigeki films
Japanese Western (genre) films
Films set in Bakumatsu
1990s Japanese films